¡Soltad a Barrabás! is the third album by the Spanish group Barrabás, released in 1974. The album was originally released as Release Barrabás or Hi-Jack in some other countries, but the modern CD release retains the Spanish title. It was the first album recorded outside their native Spain.

"Hi-Jack" / "Lady Love" was released as a single, reached № 1 in Spain, but only made the Bubbling Under Hot 100 Charts in the U.S., peaking as high as No. 104 over there, however , the song was successfully covered by American jazz musician Herbie Mann in 1975, in which his version became the much bigger hit success in the U.S.

Track listing
"Hi-Jack" (Fernando Arbex) – 5:46
"Mad Love" (Arbex) – 4:15
"Funky Baby" (Enrique Morales, Miguel Morales) – 3:56
"Lady Love" (E. Morales) – 4:14
"Susie Wong" (Arbex) – 4:32
"Humanity" (José María Moll, Jesús Moll) – 3:24
"Tell Me the Thing" (Ernesto Duarte) – 3:18
"Fly Away" (M. Morales, José Luís Tejada) – 4:26
"Concert" (E. Morales, M. Morales, David Waterston) – 4:15

Personnel
José Luís Tejada – lead vocals (1, 2, 5–9)
Enrique "Ricky" Morales – lead and acoustic guitars, lead (3 & 4) and backing vocals
Miguel Morales – bass guitar, acoustic guitar, lead (3 & 4) and backing vocals
Ernesto "Tito" Duarte – saxophone, flute, percussion, drums
Juan Vidal – keyboards
José María Moll – drums
"The Waters" (Maxine, Julia & Patti) – backing vocals
Produced by Fernando Arbex
Recorded at MGM Polydor Studios, Hollywood
Sound engineer – Humberto Gatica
Sleeve design – Miquel A. López Parras

Release information
Spain – Ariola Eurodisc 87912
France – Eurodisc 87912 (as Hi-Jack)
USA& – Atco SD 36-110 / Atlantic ATC 9580 (as Hi-Jack)
Disconforme DISC 1994CD (2000 CD)

References

 Entry at Allmusic []
 Album cover / sleeve notes

1974 albums
Barrabás albums
Ariola Records albums
Atco Records albums
Atlantic Records albums